The Cor Baayen Award is an annual award given to a promising young researcher in computer science and applied mathematics. 
In 1995, the award was created to honor the first ERCIM (European Research Consortium for Informatics and Mathematics) president.

As a young researcher award, nominees must have obtained their PhD in the three years before the yearly nomination deadline.
A researcher can be nominated for the award only once.
The award is presented as a check for 5000 Euro and a certificate. The awardee is then invited to ERCIM meetings the following autumn. 
An article is published in ERCIM news with the name of the winner, and all nominees of the year.

See also 

 List of computer science awards
 List of mathematics awards

References

Computer science awards
Mathematics awards
European awards
Awards established in 1995